Spain competed at the 2000 Summer Paralympics in Sydney, Australia. The team included 210 athletes—158 on foot and 52 wheelchairs. Spanish competitors won 106 medals, 38 gold, 30 silver and 38 bronze, to finish 4th in the medal table.

Medal table

Cheating scandal

Spain's intellectual disability basketball team won the tournament and gold medals, but these medals were soon stripped from the team.  Shortly after the Games closed, Carlos Ribagorda, a member of the victorious team and an undercover journalist, revealed to the Spanish business magazine Capital that ten of the twelve members of the team were "ringers", that is, normal basketball players who were not disabled recruited to make the team stronger.  None of these members underwent tests to verify they were actually disabled, nor would they have qualified had the tests been performed.

See also
Spain at the Paralympics
Spain at the 2000 Summer Olympics
Cheating at the Paralympic Games

References

External links
International Paralympic Committee

Nations at the 2000 Summer Paralympics
Paralympics
2000